Misty's Big Adventure are an English eight-piece band from Birmingham. Their music is an eclectic mix of jazz, lounge, psychedelia, 2 tone, pop and punk.

The band is composed of singer and sole songwriter Grandmaster Gareth (real name Gareth Jones), drummer Sam Minnear, bassist Matt Jones, guitarist Jonathan Kedge, trumpet player Hannah Baines, saxophone player Lucy Baines, keyboardist Lucy Bassett and dancer Erotic Volvo.

Drummer Sam Minnear's father is Kerry Minnear, who played keyboards, cello and vibes for British progressive rock band Gentle Giant during the 1970s. 

On 19 May 2022, it was announced via social media that frontman Grandmaster Gareth had died on 16th May 2022, two days after the band had headlined the Hare & Hounds in their home town of Birmingham. No further announcement was made concerning the future of the band.

About the band
A long time fixture on the Birmingham experimental music scene, Grandmaster Gareth formed the band in 1996 with his friend Sam Minnear. The name was taken from a story in the 1968 children's book The Magic Roundabout Annual about a kitten, Misty, who meets a dog with whom she becomes friends.

Misty's songs typically consist of Grandmaster Gareth singing in a deadpan, maudlin style accompanied by lively guitar, keyboards and brass players. They occasionally include samples and toy instruments in their songs. Contrasting with Gareth's dour lounge-singer act is the dancer Erotic Volvo. Dressed in a loose, full-body red sack with numerous stuffed blue gloves attached, and his face painted purple, he dances continuously and in a frantic manner, often moving around the audience. He occasionally also performs as a human beat box.

All members of the band are trained musicians, and are predominantly based in the Moseley suburb of Birmingham. The band's home venue was the Jug of Ale in Moseley, where they played regularly until it was shut down in 2008; fittingly, Misty's played the last ever gig held there. They have played widely outside Birmingham too and since 2005 they have toured extensively around the UK with forays into Europe, and supported The Zutons and The Magic Numbers. During the early 2000's they were managed by Mathew Priest, the drummer with Dodgy.

Their debut album, Misty's Big Adventure and Their Place in the Solar Hi-Fi System, was released in 2004, produced by Richard March of Bentley Rhythm Ace and Matthew Eaton of Pram. Their follow-up albums, The Black Hole (2005) and Funny Times (2007), were produced by Brian O'Shaughnessy whose production credits include Primal Scream, Denim and The Firm's "Star Trekkin'."

Gareth occasionally toured as Misty's Little Adventure with a stripped down band, featuring himself on guitar, backed only by drums, trumpet and saxophone.

In 2003, Gareth recorded the solo album Grandmaster Gareth Presents... An Introduction To Minute Melodies. This was accompanied by a John Peel session entitled "Grandmaster Gareth's Monster Melody," a CDR EP which was available for purchase from the band's website. A second album of one-minute melodies, The Party Sounds of Grandmaster Gareth, was released on SL Records in May 2006. This featured 29 tracks varying in length from 47 seconds to 1 minute 29 seconds. The bonus track "Monster Melody" (different from the version in their Peel session) was also included to end the album. Contributors to this album included the other members of Misty's, Brute Force, Jeffrey Lewis, Dog Food's Mr Simon and Bom & His Magic Drumstick.

The humourist Dave Gorman is a fan of Misty's Big Adventure, and the DVD The Dave Gorman Collection features a special song and video as an extra. The song is titled "54 Dave Gormans". The band also provided the theme tune to his TV series Genius.

In 2007 the BBC used the instrumental version of "Fashion Parade" as the music to their The Edwardians trailer, while ITV used the same version in their trailer for their reality show This Is David Gest. On radio, the instrumental version was used by The Geoff Show on Virgin Radio as backing music to one of their regular features. It has also been used as the soundtrack to an Irish anti-litter campaign.

In 2019 the band released the 2LP & CD The Young Person's Guide to Misty's Big Adventure. The Young Person's Guide to Misty's Big Adventure is a double LP compilation featuring the "best of", as selected by Grandmaster Gareth.  In honour of the dancer of the band, Erotic Volvo, the albums are coloured vinyl—one red and one blue. Served up in a gatefold sleeve, the limited edition pack included a fold-out poster and CD.

Influences
Gareth cited local Birmingham bands Pram, Broadcast, Dog Food and Novak as teenage influences. Seven-piece Novak had an "anything goes" attitude combined with skilled musicianship that Misty's exhibit. Other influences include Raymond Scott, Julian Cope, The Beatles, The Specials, Joe Meek and Can.

Other projects and associations
Grandmaster Gareth worked as producer with anti-folk artist Jeffrey Lewis during 2004.  Some of these recordings are featured on City and Eastern Tapes (2008).

Misty's, and Gareth in particular, are strong supporters of the local Birmingham music scene.

Misty's 2006 single "Fashion Parade" features 3/4 of Northampton indie-punk rockers The Retro Spankees and a guest appearance by Noddy Holder. The music video features The Teats.

Discography

Albums

Singles

References

External links
 Band website
 SL Records
 MySpace page
 Noisedeluxe Records, Misty's German Label
 Bearded Magazine website

English experimental musical groups
Musical groups established in 1996
English pop music groups
Musical groups from Birmingham, West Midlands